Edson Araujo Tavares (born 10 June 1956 in Rio de Janeiro) is a Brazilian football manager who is currently in charge of Sanat Naft.

References

External links
SambaFoot Profile

Living people
1956 births
Brazilian football managers
J2 League managers
FC Fribourg managers
Jordan national football team managers
Chile national football team managers
Al Hilal SFC managers
persija Jakarta managers
Chongqing Liangjiang Athletic F.C. managers
Vietnam national football team managers
Haiti national football team managers
Yokohama FC managers
Shenzhen F.C. managers
Sepahan S.C. managers
Al-Ramtha SC managers
americano Futebol Clube managers
Brazilian expatriate football managers
Brazilian expatriate sportspeople in Switzerland
Expatriate football managers in Switzerland
Brazilian expatriate sportspeople in Jordan
Expatriate football managers in Jordan
Brazilian expatriate sportspeople in Chile
Expatriate football managers in Chile
Brazilian expatriate sportspeople in Saudi Arabia
Expatriate football managers in Saudi Arabia
Brazilian expatriate sportspeople in China
Expatriate football managers in China
Brazilian expatriate sportspeople in Vietnam
Expatriate football managers in Vietnam
Expatriate football managers in Haiti
Brazilian expatriate sportspeople in Japan
Expatriate football managers in Japan
Brazilian expatriate sportspeople in Iran
Expatriate football managers in Iran
Brazilian expatriate sportspeople in Kuwait
Expatriate football managers in Kuwait
Kuwait Premier League managers
Al-Salmiya SC managers
Khaitan SC managers
Brazilian expatriate sportspeople in Haiti
Footballers from Rio de Janeiro (city)
Persian Gulf Pro League managers